The 2014–15 Serie A di calcio femminile was the 48th edition of the premier category of the Italian women's football championship. It ran from 4 October 2014 to 16 May 2015 and it was contested by fourteen teams.  Verona won its fifth title, first since 2008-09.  They finished the season one point ahead of Brescia.  Both teams qualified for the 2015–16 UEFA Women's Champions League.

League table

Relegation play-off

Results

Top goalscorers

References

2014-15
2014–15 domestic women's association football leagues
Women
1